Abdul Khaliq Ghijduvani (died 1179) was one of a group of Central Asian Sufi teachers known simply as Khwajagan (the Masters) of the Naqshbandi order.

Abdul Khaliq was born in the small town of Ghijduvan, near Bukhara. His father had migrated to Central Asia from Malatya, in eastern Anatolia where he had been a prominent faqih. While Abdul Khaliq was studying tafsir in Bukhara he first had an awakening of interest in the path. He received further training at the hands of Yusuf Hamdani, and was the next link in the Naqshbandi silsila following him.

The way Abdul Khaliq taught became known as the way of the Khojas - teachers.

Abdul Khaliq bequeathed to subsequent generations of the Naqshbandi silsila a series of principles governing their Sufi practice, concisely formulated in Persian and known collectively as "the Sacred Words" (kalimat-i qudsiya), or the "Rules" or "Secrets" of the Naqshbandi Order.

See also
 Eleven Naqshbandi principles
 Mir Sayyid Ali Hamadani

References

Bibliography

External links
 Eleven Principles Of The Naqshbandi Sufi Order
Eleven Principles in Order (first eight from Gajadwani) from the Khwajagan Masters of Love

1179 deaths
Sufi teachers
Naqshbandi order
Year of birth unknown